30718 Records, provisional designation , is a dark background asteroid from the central region of the asteroid belt, approximately 9 kilometers in diameter. It was discovered on 14 September 1955, by Indiana University's Indiana Asteroid Program at its Goethe Link Observatory near Brooklyn, Indiana, United States. It was the program's final discovery and was named after IU's astronomy staff member Brenda Records.

Classification and orbit 

Records is a non-family from the main belt's background population. It orbits the Sun in the central asteroid belt at a distance of 1.9–3.6 AU once every 4 years and 7 months (1,679 days). Its orbit has an eccentricity of 0.32 and an inclination of 5° with respect to the ecliptic. As no precoveries were taken, the body's observation arc begins with its official discovery observation in 1955.

Physical characteristics 

According to the survey carried out by the NEOWISE mission of NASA's Wide-field Infrared Survey Explorer, Records measures  kilometers in diameter and its surface has a low albedo of 0.066.

As of 2018, the asteroid's spectral type, as well as its rotation period and shape remain unknown.

Naming 

This minor planet honors Brenda Records (born 1946), who served as office manager for the Indiana University Department of Astronomy for over 20 years. Records was also an administrative assistant to astronomer Frank K. Edmondson, transcribing several of his books. The official naming citation was published by the Minor Planet Center on 24 November 2007.

References

External links 
 Asteroid Lightcurve Database (LCDB), query form (info )
 Dictionary of Minor Planet Names, Google books
 Asteroids and comets rotation curves, CdR – Observatoire de Genève, Raoul Behrend
 Discovery Circumstances: Numbered Minor Planets (30001)-(35000) – Minor Planet Center
 
 

030718
030718
Named minor planets
19550914